The Albin Hagström Memorial Award was a prize that was awarded between 1997 and 2006 by the Royal Swedish Academy of Music in memory of Albin Hagström, a well-known accordionist and accordion maker from Älvdalen and the founder of the Hagström company. 

The award was given to an accordionist or guitarist, and the prizewinner was selected by the Kärstin Hagström-Heikkinen Music Award Fund.

Since 2007, several scholarships have been awarded to accordionists and guitarists in popular music. The applicant cannot be older than 35 and must be a Swedish citizen. The scholarships are only awarded to individuals.

List of recipients
2006: Arnstein Johansen
2005: Lasse Wellander
2004: Olav Wernersen
2003: Kenny Håkansson
2002: Sone Banger
2001: Georg Wadenius
2000: Lasse Holm
1999: Janne Schaffer
1998: Sören Rydgren
1997: Rune Gustafsson

References

External links
 Albert Hagström Memorial Award

Swedish music awards
Awards established in 1997
1997 in Swedish music